Silvan (born May 18, 1937) is an Italian illusionist, writer and television personality.

Life and career 
Born Aldo Savoldello in Venice, Silvan started his career at 20 years old and made his television debut in 1956, in the RAI show Primo applauso ("First applause"). He gained mainstream popularity in 1973 hosting the RAI Saturday night magic and illusionism show Sim Salabim. After six decades as a magician Silvan continues to perform on television and touring his full evening show.

Silvan won two Merlin Awards, in 1998 and in 2011, being the first Italian magician to win the award. The  Academy of Magical Arts awarded him "Magician of the Year" twice, in 1990 and in 1999. He is also in the “Hall of Fame” of the Society of American Magicians. In 2018 The Magic Circle awarded him The Devant for "Services to International Magic".

Silvan has written several books, appeared in some films and has collaborated with a number of publications. He is an honorary member of CICAP, a skeptic scientific organization.

References

External links
 
 

1937 births
Living people
People from Venice
Italian television personalities
Italian magicians
Academy of Magical Arts Masters Fellowship winners